Family with sequence similarity 122A is a protein that in humans is encoded by the FAM122A gene.

References 

Human proteins